This is a list of members of the Western Australian Legislative Assembly from 2013 to 2017.

 On 3 September 2014, the Liberal member for Vasse, Troy Buswell, resigned. Liberal candidate Libby Mettam was elected to replace him at the by-election for Vasse on 18 October 2014.
 On 15 April 2016, the Liberal member for Hillarys, Rob Johnson, resigned from the Liberal Party to sit as an Independent.

Members of Western Australian parliaments by term